John O. "Jack" Koehler (June 11, 1930 – September 28, 2012) was a German-born American journalist and executive for the Associated Press, who also briefly served as the White House Communications Director in 1987 during the Reagan administration.

Early life and education 
Koehler was born Wolfgang Koehler in Dresden, Germany, but fled the city to escape the invasion of Soviet troops into Germany towards the end of World War II. He soon found a position as a German language interpreter for the United States Army when he was a teenager. He moved to Canada after World War II and then immigrated to the United States in 1954. Koehler enlisted in the U.S. Army, where he worked in intelligence. He legally changed his name to John Koehler after moving to the United States.

Career 
Koehler took a position with the Associated Press as a foreign correspondent in Berlin and Bonn, West Germany. He then became the Associated Press' bureau chief in Newark, New Jersey. He rose to become the assistant general manager and managing director of AP's world services, a position he held until his retirement in 1985.

The United States Information Agency recruited Koehler to lobby on behalf of Afghan rebels following the Soviet invasion of Afghanistan. He traveled to Pakistan and France to focus on helping rebels get their messages out to journalists and foreign governments.

In 1987, Koehler, who was friends with Ronald Reagan, became the White House Communications Director. However, Koehler resigned after just one week in the White House after it became public that he had been a member of the Deutsches Jungvolk, a Nazi government youth division, when he was ten years old. Koehler insisted that his membership in the Jungvolk was not the reason for his resignation, dismissing the Jungvolk as "the Boy Scouts run by the Nazi party". Rather, he said, he wanted to give his successor time to choose a new communication team. He then started an international consulting firm.

Personal life 
Koehler died from pancreatic cancer at his home in Stamford, Connecticut, on September 28, 2012, at the age of 82. He was buried with full military honors at Arlington National Cemetery.

Selected publications

References

1930 births
2012 deaths
American male journalists
Associated Press reporters
Reagan administration personnel
Burials at Arlington National Cemetery
Deaths from pancreatic cancer
German emigrants to the United States
Writers from Dresden
White House Communications Directors
Writers from Stamford, Connecticut
Deaths from cancer in Connecticut
Hitler Youth members
United States Army soldiers